The 1962 United States Senate elections was an election for the United States Senate. Held on November 6, the 34 seats of Class 3 were contested in regular elections. Special elections were also held to fill vacancies. They occurred in the middle of President John F. Kennedy's term. His Democratic Party made a net gain of four seats from the Republicans, increasing their control of the Senate to 68-32. However, this was reduced to 67-33 between the election and the next Congress, as on November 18, 1962, Democrat Dennis Chávez, who was not up for election that year, died. He was replaced on November 30, 1962, by Republican appointee Edwin L. Mechem. This was the first time since 1932 that Democrats gained seats in this class of Senators.

This was the first time since 1914 that the president's party gained seats in the Senate and lost seats in the House, this would occur again in 1970, 2018, and 2022. This was the last time until 2022 that the Democrats would win full terms in Arizona's and Pennsylvania's Class 3 Senate seats.

Results summary 

Source:

Gains, losses, and holds

Retirements
Two Republicans and two Democrats retired instead of seeking re-election.

Defeats
Four Republicans and one Democrat sought re-election but lost in the primary or general election.

Post-election changes
One Democrat died on November 18, 1962, and a Republican was appointed on November 30, 1962.

Change in composition

Before the elections

Elections results

Beginning of the next Congress

Race summaries

Special elections during the 87th Congress 
In these special elections, the winner was seated during 1962 or before January 3, 1963; ordered by election date, then state.

Elections leading to the next Congress 
In these regular elections, the winners were elected for the term beginning January 3, 1963; ordered by state.

All of the elections involved the Class 3 seats.

Closest races 
Nineteen races had a margin of victory under 10%:

Nevada was the tipping point state with a margin of 30.6%.

Alabama

Alaska 

Incumbent Ernest Gruening defeated the Republican challenger, former U.S. Attorney, Interior Solicitor & future long-time U.S. Senator Ted Stevens, to win re-election to a full term.

Arizona 

Incumbent Democrat Carl Hayden defeated future Governor Evan Mecham to win re-election to a seventh term.

Arkansas

California

Colorado

Connecticut

Florida

Georgia

Hawaii

Idaho

Idaho (regular)

Idaho (special)

Illinois

Indiana

Iowa

Kansas

Kansas (regular)

Kansas (special)

Kentucky

Louisiana

Maryland

Massachusetts (special) 

John F. Kennedy, originally elected to the U.S. Senate in 1952 United States Senate election in Massachusetts, resigned in 1961 after being elected in the 1960 United States presidential election. Incumbent Benjamin A. Smith II chose not to run for re-election. Ted Kennedy, brother of John and Attorney General Robert F. Kennedy, defeated Edward J. McCormack, Jr. by a wide margin in the Democratic primary. In the Republican primary, U.S. Assistant Secretary of Labor for International Affairs George C. Lodge defeated U.S. representative Laurence Curtis in a close race.

A battle between two candidates from influential political families, H. Stuart Hughes ran as an independent. Kennedy defeated Lodge with 55% of the vote to 42% for Lodge, with 2% to Hughes. Kennedy would serve until 2010.

Missouri

Nevada

New Hampshire

New Hampshire (regular)

New Hampshire (special)

New York

North Carolina

North Dakota 

Incumbent Republican Milton Young was re-elected to his fourth term, defeating North Dakota Democratic-NPL Party candidate William Lanier of Fargo. Only Young filed as a Republican, and the endorsed Democratic candidate was Lanier, who had previously faced Young in a special election held in 1946 to fill the seat which was vacated by the late John Moses. Young and Lanier won the primary elections for their respective parties. No independents ran.

Ohio

Oklahoma

Oregon 

Democratic incumbent Wayne Morse was re-elected to a fourth term. He defeated Republican candidate Sig Unander in the general election.

Pennsylvania

South Carolina 

Incumbent Democratic Senator Olin D. Johnston defeated Governor Fritz Hollings in the Democratic primary and Republican W. D. Workman Jr. in the general election.  The South Carolina Democratic Party held their primary on June 12, 1962. Olin D. Johnston, the incumbent Senator, faced stiff competition from Governor Fritz Hollings who argued that Johnston was too liberal and not representative of South Carolina interests.  Johnston merely told the voters that he was doing what he thought was best for the agriculture and textile workers of the state.  Hollings was decisively defeated by Johnston because Johnston used his position as Post Office and Civil Service Committee to build 40 new post offices in the state and thus demonstrate the pull he had in Washington to bring home the bacon.

W. D. Workman Jr., a correspondent for the News and Courier, faced no opposition from South Carolina Republicans and avoided a primary election.

Both Johnston and Workman supported segregation, so the campaign centered on the economic issues of the state.  Workman tried to persuade the voters that Johnston's policies were socialist and that he was too closely aligned with the Kennedy administration.  Johnston was a consistent supporter of socialized health care proposals and Workman was able to win considerable support from the medical establishment.  However, the state's citizens were much poorer than that of the rest of the nation and Johnston's class based appeals made him a very popular figure for the downtrodden of both the white and black races.  The competitive nature of this race foresaw the eventual rise of the Republican Party and that South Carolinians were growing increasingly suspicious of policies generated at the federal level.

South Dakota

Utah

Vermont

Washington

Wisconsin 

Incumbent Republican Alexander Wiley lost to Democrat Gaylord A. Nelson.

Wyoming (special)

See also
 1962 United States elections
 1962 United States gubernatorial elections
 1962 United States House of Representatives elections
 87th United States Congress
 88th United States Congress

Notes

References 
 "Supplemental Report of the Secretary of State to the General Assembly of South Carolina." Reports and Resolutions of South Carolina to the General Assembly of the State of South Carolina. Volume II. Columbia, SC: 1963, p. 6.